Pyramidella subdolabrata is a species of sea snail, a marine gastropod mollusk in the family Pyramidellidae, the pyrams and their allies.

Description
The shell grows to  a length of 30 mm.

Distribution
This marine species occurs off Puerto Rico, the Virgin Islands and Anguilla.

References

External links
 To Encyclopedia of Life
 To ITIS
 To World Register of Marine Species

Pyramidellidae
Gastropods described in 1854